Think Before You Speak is the debut album by English indie rock band Good Shoes, which was released on 26 March 2007 on Brille Records. The album was recorded in nineteen days in Malmö in Sweden by Per Sunding at Tambourine Studios.

Track listing
 "Nazanin" – 2:06
 "The Photos On My Wall" – 1:52
 "Morden" – 2:29
 "All In My Head" – 2:32
 "Never Meant to Hurt You" – 3:31
 "Blue Eyes" – 3:33
 "Sophia" – 3:12
 "We Are Not the Same" – 2:43
 "Small Town Girl" – 3:39
 "In the City" – 2:37
 "Things to Make and Do" – 2:45
 "Everybody's Talking" – 1:47
 "Ice Age" – 2:53
 "Wait" – 2:53

Personnel
Rhys Jones – vocals, guitar
Steve Leach – guitar
Joel Cox – bass guitar
Tom Jones – drums

References

External links
Think Before You Speak review at SUPERSWEET

2007 debut albums
Good Shoes albums